Przewalsky's gecko (Phyllopezus przewalskii) is a species of gecko, a lizard in the family Phyllodactylidae. The species is endemic to South America.

Etymology
The specific name, przewalskii, is in honor of Russian naturalist Nikolay Przhevalsky.

Geographic range
P. przewalskii is found in Argentina, Bolivia, Brazil, and Paraguay.

Description
The holotype has the following measurements: total length ; head, ; body, ; tail, .

References

Further reading
Koslowsky J (1895). "Un nuevo geco de Matto Grosso ". Revista del Museo de la Plata 6: 371-373 + Plate I. (Phyllopezus przewalskii, new species). (in Spanish).

Phyllopezus
Reptiles of Brazil
Reptiles described in 1895
Taxa named by Julio Germán Koslowsky